Dermot Kehilly (born 1944) is an Irish retired Gaelic footballer who played as a full-back for the Cork senior football team.

Born in Newcestown, County Cork, Kehilly first played competitive football in his youth. He arrived on the inter-county scene at the age of seventeen when he first linked up with the Cork minor team, before later joining the under-21 and junior sides. He made his senior debut during the 1965 championship and was a regular member of the starting fifteen for a brief period. He was a Munster runner-up on one occasion.

At club level Kehily won numerous championship medals with Newcestown.

Throughout his career Kehilly played just three championship games for Cork. His retirement came following the conclusion of the 1969 championship.

Kehilly's brothers, Kevin and Frank, also played Gaelic football with Cork.

Honours

Team

Newcestown
Cork Intermediate Football Championship (1): 1971
Cork Junior Hurling Championship (1): 1972
Cork Junior Football Championship (1): 1967

Cork
All-Ireland Junior Football Championship (1): 1972
Munster Junior Football Championship (1): 1972
Munster Under-21 Football Championship (1): 1963
All-Ireland Minor Football Championship (1): 1961 (sub)
Munster Minor Football Championship (1): 1961 (sub)

References

1944 births
Living people
Newcestown Gaelic footballers
Newcestown hurlers
Cork inter-county Gaelic footballers